Jamal Fogarty (born 13 December 1993) is an Australian professional rugby league footballer who plays as a  for the Canberra Raiders in the NRL.

He previously played for the Gold Coast Titans in the National Rugby League. Fogarty is an Indigenous All Stars representative.

Background
Fogarty was born in Beaudesert, Queensland, Australia, and is a member of the Mununjali clan of the Yugambeh people. He played his junior rugby league for the Beaudesert Kingfishers, before being signed by the Gold Coast Titans. Fogarty attended Palm Beach Currumbin State High School throughout his upbringing.

Playing career

Early career
In October 2011, Fogarty played for the Australian Schoolboys. In 2012 and 2013, he played for the Gold Coast Titans' NYC team, before graduating to their Queensland Cup team, Tweed Heads Seagulls in 2014. In 2016, he joined Queensland Cup team Burleigh Bears. He was a member of the Burleigh Bears 2016 Queensland Cup winning side, defeating the Redcliffe Dolphins in the final. In November 2016, he signed a one-year contract with the Parramatta Eels, starting in 2017.

2017
In June, after spending the season so far playing for Eels' feeder club, Wentworthville Magpies, Fogarty was granted a release mid-season to return to the Burleigh Bears. 

He signed a contract with the Titans and just under a fortnight after being released by the Eels, he made his NRL debut for the Titans in round 16 of the 2017 NRL season against the Wests Tigers.

2018
Fogarty made no appearances for Gold Coast Titans in 2018 and spent the entire year playing for the Burleigh Bears making 17 appearances in total.

2019
In 2019, Fogarty rejoined the Burleigh Bears full-time, starting at halfback in their Grand Final win over the Wynnum Manly Seagulls. On 27 September, Fogarty won the Petero Civoniceva Medal at the QRL awards.

2020
On 7 March, Fogarty signed with the Gold Coast Titans on a two-year deal.
In round 9 2020, Fogarty scored his first points in the top grade by kicking a conversion in the 16-12 win over New Zealand Warriors.
In round 15, Fogarty was named as the captain of the team in the absence of Kevin Proctor.  In the same match, Fogarty was chased down by Canberra forward Josh Papalii after seemingly running away to score a try. Following the game, Fogarty spoke to media saying "I was very embarrassed. I've been copping a lot of text messages from people so I think I might throw my phone in the bin after the last couple of days".

The following week, Fogarty scored the winning try as the Gold Coast defeated St. George 14-10 at Kogarah Oval.

2021
On 2 February, Fogarty was named at halfback in the Indigenous All Stars team to play the New Zealand Māori at Queensland Country Bank Stadium.

Fogarty asked the Gold Coast club for a release in September 2021 due to it becoming apparent that Toby Sexton would land the starting halfback role for 2022. He signed for the Canberra Raiders on a three-year deal shortly afterwards.

2022
On 2 March, Fogarty was ruled out for four months with a knee injury which he sustained in Canberra's pre-season trial against Manly.
In round 12 of the 2022 NRL season, Fogarty made his club debut for Canberra in their 28-20 loss against Parramatta.
In round 25, Fogarty scored one try and kicked seven goals in Canberra's 56-10 victory over wooden spooners the Wests Tigers.
Fogarty played a total of 15 games for Canberra in 2022 as the club finished 8th on the table and qualified for the finals.  Fogarty played in both finals matches as Canberra were eliminated in the second week by Parramatta.

Achievements and accolades

Individual
Petero Civoniceva Medal: 2019
Queensland Cup Team of the Year: 2016

References

External links
Gold Coast Titans profile
NRL profile
QRL.com profile

1993 births
Living people
Australian rugby league players
Burleigh Bears players
Gold Coast Titans captains
Gold Coast Titans players
Canberra Raiders players
Indigenous Australian rugby league players
Rugby league fullbacks
Rugby league halfbacks
Rugby league players from Queensland
Tweed Heads Seagulls players
Wentworthville Magpies players